Clyomys is a South American rodent genus in the family Echimyidae. It contains two species, found in tropical savannas and grasslands from circa  to  elevation in central Brazil and eastern Paraguay.

The Clyomys  species are as follows:
 Broad-headed spiny rat (Clyomys laticeps)
 † Clyomys riograndensis

Phylogeny 
Clyomys is the sister genus to Euryzygomatomys. Both taxa are closely related to the genus Trinomys.
In turn, these three genera — forming the clade of Euryzygomatomyinae — share phylogenetic affinities with a clade containing Carterodon and members of the family Capromyidae.

Analyses of craniodental characters proposed that Clyomys — and also Euryzygomatomys — may be associated with Carterodon.
However, molecular data suggest the polyphyly of this assemblage of fossorial genera.

References

Echimyidae
Rodent genera
Taxa named by Oldfield Thomas